Kansas City Assembly Plant (KCAP) is a Ford Motor Company automobile assembly facility which produces the Ford F-150 and the Ford Transit. It is the largest car manufacturing plant in the United States in terms of vehicles produced.

Current
The  on  facility employs approximately 7,000 people. In addition to the main final assembly plant, KCAP also includes a stamping plant for the Ford Transit, a separate body shop and a separate paint shop for the Ford F-150. Plant tours were discontinued on September 12, 2001, the day after the September 11 attacks.

In December 2010 Ford announced it was moving the Ford Escape and Ford Escape Hybrid to the Louisville Assembly Plant, which underwent US$600 million in renovations. The move stirred fears that it could result in the loss of half the jobs at the 3,700-person plant.

The Missouri state government had been anticipating changes at the plant. In 2010 the state passed the Missouri Manufacturing Jobs Act providing tax incentives for companies that invest in plants in the state by allowing them to keep employee withholding taxes. While the bill would benefit all industrial businesses it was specifically targeting the plant and was introduced by Missouri State Representative Jerry Nolte, whose district includes the plant.  Ford could save US$150 million over ten years if it invests in the plant.  The bill had been the subject of a filibuster by Missouri State Senator Chuck Purgason who objected to the favoritism extended to Ford and read aloud sections of Allan W. Eckert's The Frontiersman into the record.

A day after the announcement of the move of the Escape, Ford said a yet-to-be-announced line would replace the Escape. In 2011, Ford said it would spend US$1.1 billion on additions and upgrades, including a new stamping plant. In 2012, it was announced that the plant would be the North American lead production site for the new Ford Transit, which replaced the discontinued Ford E-Series vans.

Products
Kansas City Assembly Plant opened in 1951 for military production. Converted to auto assembly in 1956, it began production as a civilian vehicle assembly plant in 1957. Since then, KCAP has built the following vehicles:

Current products
Ford Transit (2014–present)
Ford F-150 (1957–present)

Former products
Mercury Mariner (2005–2011)
Lincoln Blackwood (2002)
Ford Escape (2001–2012)
Mazda Tribute (2001–2011)
Mercury Mystique (1995–2000)
Ford Contour (1995–2000)
Mercury Topaz (1984–1994)
Ford Tempo (1984–1994)
Mercury Zephyr (1978–1983) 
Ford Fairmont (1978–1983) 
Ford Maverick (1970–1977)
Mercury Meteor (1961–1963)
Mercury Comet (1960–1977)
Ford Falcon (1960–1970)
Ford Fairlane (1955–1961)

References

External links
Official Ford site

Ford factories
Mazda factories
Motor vehicle assembly plants in Missouri
Buildings and structures in the Kansas City metropolitan area